The economy of Anguilla depends heavily on luxury tourism, offshore banking, lobster fishing, and remittances from emigrants. Due to its small size, few natural resources, and reliance on tourism and foreign direct investment, Anguilla is vulnerable to external economic conditions in the United States, Canada and Europe. Therefore, economic growth in Anguilla can be very volatile.

History

In the 19th century, Anguilla's major product was salt produced by evaporation on the shores of the island's lakes, which was exported to the United States. Sugar, cotton, sweetcorn, and tobacco were also grown. By the beginning of World War I, the island had been almost entirely deforested by charcoal-burners. Most of the land was held by black sustenance farmers producing sweet potatoes, peas, beans, and corn and rearing sheep and goats. Salt continued to be exported to nearby Saint Thomas, along with phosphate of lime and cattle.

Modern Anguilla has focused its development on tourism, its related construction industry, and offshore finance. The first comprehensive financial services legislation was enacted in late 1994. The island was damaged by Hurricane Luis in September, 1995, and again during Hurricane Lenny in 2000.

Industry

Major industries in Anguilla include tourism, boat building, and offshore financial services. In 1997 there was an industrial production growth rate of 3.1%.

42.6 GWh of electricity are consumed, produced entirely by fossil fuel.

Agricultural products include small quantities of tobacco, vegetables, and cattle raising.

In 2011 Anguilla became the fifth-largest jurisdiction for captive insurance, behind Bermuda, Cayman, Vermont and Guernsey. The captive industry plays an ever-increasing and important part of Anguilla's financial services industry. Captive management firms, including Capstone Associated Services, have staffed offices in Anguilla in order to service the fast-growing captive insurance industry.

Notes

References
 
 
 

Attribution: